Lieutenant-General William Augustus Johnson (15 October 1777, in Kenilworth – 26 October 1863, in Witham, Lincolnshire) was an English soldier and Member of Parliament.

He was the eldest son of Church of England clergyman the Rev. Robert Augustus Johnson and Anna Rebecca (youngest sister of Lord Craven) and a descendant of Archdeacon Robert Johnson. He was educated at Rugby School.

He married Lucy Foster (1815–1890) on 17 February 1835.

Commissioned as an ensign of foot in 1793, and promoted captain in 1794, he served in the campaign of 1808–9 in the Peninsular War, as Major in the 32nd Regiment, and was present at the battles of Roliça, Vimiero, and Corunna. Johnson then served through the Walcheren expedition in 1809. In 1810 he became lieutenant-colonel in the 3rd Ceylon Regiment.

Johnson inherited the Witham on the Hill estate in Lincolnshire from an uncle in 1814 and left active duty on half-pay to run the estate. He continued to receive promotions, to full colonel in 1819, major-general in 1830 and lieutenant-general in 1841. He retired from the army in 1842.

He stood many times for Parliament, and served as Member of Parliament for Boston, 1821–1826 and for Oldham, 1837–1847.

He was a Magistrate, Deputy Lieutenant of Lincolnshire and Northamptonshire, and High Sheriff of Lincolnshire for 1830.

When slavery was abolished in 1833, he received compensation for the loss of slaves in Antigua.

He died, following a fall at his home, in 1863 aged 86.

References

External links 
 

1777 births
1863 deaths
People from South Kesteven District
People educated at Rugby School
British Army personnel of the French Revolutionary Wars
32nd Regiment of Foot officers
Deputy Lieutenants of Lincolnshire
Deputy Lieutenants of Northamptonshire
Members of the Parliament of the United Kingdom for English constituencies
UK MPs 1820–1826
UK MPs 1837–1841
UK MPs 1841–1847
High Sheriffs of Lincolnshire
People from Kenilworth